These hits topped the Dutch Top 40 in 1991.

See also
1991 in music

References

1991 in the Netherlands
Netherlands
1991